Bynum is a former census-designated place in Calhoun County, Alabama, United States. At the 2000 census the population was 1,863. The area is now part of the city of Oxford and is included in the Anniston–Oxford, Alabama Metropolitan Statistical Area.

Geography
Bynum is located in the westernmost part of the city of Oxford at 33°36'21.546" North, 85°57'47.909" West (33.605985, -85.963308). It is bordered to the north by the Anniston Army Depot.

Demographics

As of the census of 2000, there were 1,863 people, 734 households, and 546 families residing in the community. The racial makeup of the community was 86.96% White, 9.98% Black or African American, 0.70% Native American, 0.16% Asian, 0.54% from other races, and 1.66% from two or more races. 1.40% of the population were Hispanic or Latino of any race.

There were 734 households, out of which 32.3% had children under the age of 18 living with them, 59.8% were married couples living together, 11.2% had a female householder with no husband present, and 25.5% were non-families. 21.7% of all households were made up of individuals, and 8.3% had someone living alone who was 65 years of age or older. The average household size was 2.54 and the average family size was 2.94.

The age distribution of the population shows 23.7% under the age of 18, 10.1% from 18 to 24, 29.0% from 25 to 44, 25.6% from 45 to 64, and 11.6% who were 65 years of age or older. The median age was 37 years. For every 100 females, there were 95.1 males. For every 100 females age 18 and over, there were 95.7 males.

The median income for a household in Bynum was $34,375, and the median income for a family was $41,439. Males had a median income of $32,479 versus $23,452 for females. The per capita income for the community was $17,194. About 9.5% of families and 10.5% of the population were below the poverty line, including 18.1% of those under age 18 and 4.2% of those age 65 or over.

References 

Unincorporated communities in Alabama
Geography of Calhoun County, Alabama
Former census-designated places in Alabama